Kirkbride is a village and civil parish in the Allerdale borough of Cumbria, England. The civil parish population at the 2011 census was 489.

History

Significant ancient historical remains close to Kirkbride include the Kirkbride Roman fort and Hadrian's Wall some miles to the north. Both Hadrian's Wall in this western reach and the Kirkbride fort were originally of turf and timber construction due to the paucity of available stone in this part of England around the Solway Plain; the Wall was later rebuilt in stone. In 122 AD, the Romans constructed Hadrian's Wall, which incorporated the Vallum earthwork. It is thought that Kirkbride Fort predates Hadrian's Wall and was built as part of the Stanegate frontier. The Wall was designed primarily to prevent entrance by small bands of raiders or unwanted immigration from the north, not as a fighting line for a major invasion according to Stephen Johnson.

LIDAR photography has proved the existence of two Roman roads linking Kirkbride Roman fort with other Roman forts. One road led north-east to the nearby fort of Coggabata on Hadrian's Wall at Drumburgh. The other, longer, road led roughly south-south-east to the large Roman fort at Old Carlisle, just south of Wigton. The road did not follow the modern direct route to Wigton, but instead skirted the east side of the River Wampool past Biglands and Gamelsby, and then turned south.

More recent history includes construction of the Church of St Bride; first recorded in 1189, it is surrounded by the area designated as Kirkbride Roman Fort. The Kirkbride war memorial also stands in the grounds of the church.

Governance
Kirkbride is part of the parliamentary constituency of Workington. In the December 2019 general election, the Conservative candidate for Workington, Mark Jenkinson, was elected as MP, overturning a 9.4 per cent Labour majority from the 2017 election to eject the previous MP Sue Hayman by a margin of 4,136 votes.

Transport
Other than by car there is a public transport option from Carlisle, the Stagecoach 93 bus

See also

Listed buildings in Kirkbride, Cumbria
Stanegate

References

External links
 Cumbria County History Trust: Kirkbride (nb: provisional research only – see Talk page)

Civil parishes in Cumbria
Villages in Cumbria
Allerdale